Byron Drury (3 October 1870 – 12 October 1897) was a Jamaican cricketer. He played in three first-class matches for the Jamaican cricket team in 1896/97.

See also
 List of Jamaican representative cricketers

References

External links
 

1870 births
1897 deaths
Jamaican cricketers
Jamaica cricketers
Cricketers from Lucknow